Following the referendum in the United Kingdom on its membership of the European Union on 23 June 2016, polling companies continued to use standard questions in order to gauge public opinion on the country's relationship with the EU.

Right/wrong

Following the EU referendum, there have been numerous opinion polls on the question of whether the UK was 'right' or 'wrong' to vote to leave the EU. The results of these polls are shown in the table below.

Selective polling

Remain/leave

There have also been polls to gauge support for remaining in or leaving the EU. The following polls, unless the notes state otherwise, asked how respondents would vote in a second referendum.

Selective polling

Three-option referendum
On 6 July 2018, the UK Cabinet agreed a statement at Chequers that set out a proposal for the future relationship between the United Kingdom and the European Union, following which two members of the Cabinet resigned. On 16 July 2018 the former Education Secretary Justine Greening noted the lack of a political consensus behind the Chequers proposal and said that, due to a 'stalemate' in the House of Commons, the issue of Brexit should be referred back to the electorate. She proposed a referendum with three options: to leave the EU on such terms as might be agreed between the UK Government and the EU 27; to leave the EU without agreed terms; or to remain in the EU. Voters would be asked to mark a first and second preference using the supplementary vote system. If there were no majority for any particular option among first-preference votes, the third-placed option would be eliminated and second preferences would be used to determine the winner from the two remaining options.

The following table shows opinion polls that have been conducted on how people would vote in a three-option referendum. The table shows the poll results for a first round in which all three options would be available, and for a second round in which only the top two options in the first round would be available.

Selective polling

Four-option referendum
Some polls have offered respondents a choice between remaining in the EU, leaving the EU but remaining within the European Single Market or EU Customs Union (see notes), accepting the negotiated deal and leaving without a deal.

Support for a third referendum (the first being in 1975)
There have been opinion polls to gauge support for a second referendum, on whether to accept or reject the final Brexit deal. Polling results vary depending on how the question is phrased: in general a "second referendum" is less popular than a "public vote" or similar descriptor. One YouGov poll conducted in April 2018 for Best for Britain showed much greater support for the public "[having] a final say on whether Britain accepts the deal or remains in the EU after all" than for "a public vote" on the same question.

Selective polling

On the UK rejoining the EU

Some polls conducted prior to the UK's formal exit worded the question as whether to rejoin rather than stay in the EU.

See also 
 Opinion polling on the United Kingdom rejoining the European Union (2020–present)
 Opinion polling for the 2019 United Kingdom general election
 Opinion polling for the next United Kingdom general election
 Opinion polling for the 2019 European Parliament election in the United Kingdom

References

External links
 EURef2 Poll of Polls — What UK Thinks

United Kingdom
European Union membership
Brexit